Mohd Shazlan bin Alias (born 27 December 1989) is a Malaysian professional footballer who plays for Melaka United in the Malaysia Super League as a right back.

Club career
A graduate of Bukit Jalil Sports School, Mohd Shazlan Alias was part of the Malaysian under-18 squad that was at that time under K. Rajagopal that competed at the ASEAN Football Championship Under-20 in Vietnam in July 2007. Despite intense competition with Mahali Jasuli for the right back position, Shazlan performances were outstanding enough to allow him to remain with the Harimau Muda squad that was at that time competing in the 2008 Malaysia Premier League.

Shazlan later played for his home state Terengganu for the 2009 edition of the Malaysia Super League but later moved to its feeder club T–Team after only one season to gain more first-team experience. While playing with T-Team,  Shazlan was selected to represent Terengganu in SUKMA 2010 that was held in Malacca where he manage to help them win the gold medal for a third time in a row beating Selangor 1–0 in the final.

After two seasons with T-Team, Shazlan accepted an offer to play for Sime Darby. His combination with captain Es Lizuan, Fairuz Abdul Aziz and Muhd Arif Ismail was proven to be a rock in defence for Sime Darby as they led the club team in creating history by shocking everyone to reach the 2012 Malaysia FA Cup competition, playing in the final only to lose to Kelantan FA 1–0.

He return to T-Team after the final playing for them for one season. Shazlan decide to join Selangor FA for the 2014 Malaysia Super League

References

External links

Malaysian footballers
Selangor FA players
Melaka United F.C. players
Negeri Sembilan FA players
Association football midfielders
People from Terengganu
1989 births
Living people
Malaysian people of Malay descent